In mathematics, a de Rham curve is a certain type of fractal curve named in honor of Georges de Rham.

The Cantor function, Cesàro curve, Minkowski's question mark function, the Lévy C curve, the blancmange curve, and Koch curve are all special cases of the general de Rham curve.

Construction
Consider some complete metric space  (generally 2 with the usual euclidean distance), and a pair of contracting maps on M:

 
 

By the Banach fixed-point theorem, these have fixed points  and  respectively.  Let x be a real number in the interval , having binary expansion

where each  is 0 or 1. Consider the map

defined by

where  denotes function composition. The collection of points , parameterized by a single real parameter x, is known as the de Rham curve.

Continuity condition
When the fixed points are paired such that

then it may be shown that the resulting curve  is a continuous function of x. When the curve is continuous, it is not in general differentiable.

In the remaining of this page, we will assume the curves are continuous.

Properties
De Rham curves are by construction self-similar, since 
 for 

The self-symmetries of all of the de Rham curves are given by the monoid that describes the symmetries of the infinite binary tree or Cantor set.  This so-called period-doubling monoid is a subset of the modular group.

The image of the curve, i.e. the set of points , can be obtained by an Iterated function system using the set of contraction mappings . But the result of an iterated function system with two contraction mappings is a de Rham curve if and only if the contraction mappings satisfy the continuity condition.

Detailed, worked examples of the self-similarities can be found in the articles on the Cantor function and on Minkowski's question-mark function. Precisely the same monoid of self-similarities, the dyadic monoid, apply to every de Rham curve.

Classification and examples

Cesàro curves

Koch–Peano curves

The name of the family comes from its two most famous members. The Koch curve is obtained by setting:

while the Peano curve corresponds to:

General affine maps

The Cesàro–Faber and Peano–Koch curves are both special cases of the general case of a pair of affine linear transformations on the complex plane. By fixing one endpoint of the curve at 0 and the other at one, the general case is obtained by iterating on the two transforms

and

Being affine transforms, these transforms act on a point  of the 2-D plane by acting on the vector

That is:

and

Since the blancmange curve of parameter  is the parabola of equation , this illustrate the fact that in some occasion, de Rham curves can be smooth.

Minkowski's question mark function
Minkowski's question mark function is generated by the pair of maps

and

Generalizations
It is easy to generalize the definition by using more than two contraction mappings. If one uses n mappings, then the n-ary decomposition of x has to be used instead of the binary expansion of real numbers. The continuity condition has to be generalized in:
, for 

This continuity condition can be understood with the following example. Suppose on is working in base-10. Then one has (famously) that 0.999...= 1.000... which is a continuity equation that must be enforced at every such gap.

Such a generalization allows, for example, to produce the Sierpiński arrowhead curve (whose image is the Sierpiński triangle), by using the contraction mappings of an iterated function system that produces the Sierpiński triangle.

Multifractal curves
Ornstein and others describe a multifractal system, where instead of working in a fixed base, one works in a variable base.

Consider the product space of variable base- discrete spaces

for  the cyclic group, for  an integer. Any real number in the unit interval can be expanded in a sequence  such that each . More precisely, a real number  is written as
 
This expansion is not unique, if all  past some point . In this case, one has that 

Such points are analogous to the dyadic rationals in the dyadic expansion, and the continuity equations on the curve must be applied at these points.

The continuity condition is then as above, 

, for 

Ornstein's original example used

See also
 Iterated function system
 Refinable function
 Modular group
 Fuchsian group

References

Further reading
 Georges de Rham, On Some Curves Defined by Functional Equations (1957), reprinted in Classics on Fractals, ed. Gerald A. Edgar (Addison-Wesley, 1993), pp. 285–298.
 Georges de Rham,  Sur quelques courbes definies par des equations fonctionnelles. Univ. e Politec. Torino. Rend. Sem. Mat., 1957, 16, 101 –113
 Linas Vepstas, A Gallery of de Rham curves, (2006).
 Linas Vepstas, Symmetries of Period-Doubling Maps, (2006). (A general exploration of the modular group symmetry in fractal curves.)